Masdevallia pumila is a species of orchid found from southern Colombia into central Bolivia.

References

External links 
 Masdevallia pumila at the Culture Sheet
 
 

pumila
Orchids of Bolivia
Orchids of Colombia
Taxa named by Eduard Friedrich Poeppig